Auguste Caulet (15 October 1926 – 16 April 2011) was a French boxer. He competed in the men's lightweight event at the 1948 Summer Olympics.

References

1926 births
2011 deaths
French male boxers
Olympic boxers of France
Boxers at the 1948 Summer Olympics
Sportspeople from Montpellier
Lightweight boxers